The World Meeting of Families is a gathering of the Roman Catholic Church that has occurred every three years since 1994. It is organized by the Dicastery for Laity, Family and Life, which "promotes the pastoral care of families, protects their rights and dignity in the Church and in civil society, so that they may ever be more able to fulfill their duties." It is the biggest gathering of Catholic families in the world. The most recent meeting took place in Dublin and the next meeting is scheduled to take place in Rome, Italy in 2022 (it was supposed to be held in 2021, but was postponed to 2022 due to the COVID-19 pandemic).

Events

See also
World Youth Day

References

External links
 2018 meeting website

 
Catholic organizations established in the 20th century
Christian conferences
Pontifical Council for the Family
Recurring events established in 1994
Triennial events